Coral Buttsworth defeated Marjorie Crawford 1–6, 6–3, 6–4, in the final to win the women's singles tennis title at the 1931 Australian Championships.

Seeds
The seeded players are listed below. Coral Buttsworth is the champion; others show the round in which they were eliminated.

  Marjorie Crawford (finalist)
  Sylvia Harper (semifinals)
  Louie Bickerton (quarterfinals)
  Coral Buttsworth (champion)
  Mall Molesworth (first round)
  Emily Hood Westacott (first round)
  Ula Valkenburg (first round)
  Kathleen Le Messurier (semifinals)

Draw

Key
 Q = Qualifier
 WC = Wild card
 LL = Lucky loser
 r = Retired

Finals

Earlier rounds

Section 1

Section 2

Notes

a Mrs. Harper severely strained a muscle of a leg and had to withdraw.

References

External links

 Source for seedings

1931 in women's tennis
1931
1931 in Australian tennis
1931 in Australian women's sport
Women's Singles